The 25th Miss Chinese International Pageant, Miss Chinese International Pageant 2014 was held on January 26, 2014. Miss Chinese International 2013 Gloria Tang of Vancouver, British Columbia, Canada crowned her successor, Grace Chan of Hong Kong at the end of the pageant.

Pageant information
The slogan to this year's pageant is "Beauty Reborn, The Fiery Phoenix" 「美麗重生 火鳳凰」.  For the first time in the history of the pageant, delegates were eliminated after each round of competition, slowing narrowing the field from 16 delegates to 14, then ten, six, and finally 5 finalists to compete for the crown.

The masters of ceremony this year are Eric Tsang, Eric Moo, and Luisa Maria Leitão.  Judges included singer Hacken Lee, model Kathy Chow, and Miss Hong Kong 1985 Second Runner-Up Ellen Wong.

TingLi Lucia Lorigiano, Montreal's representative and 2nd Runner-Up, is the younger sister of TingJia Rosalinda Lorigiano, who represented Montreal in the Miss Chinese International Pageant 2008. Lucia's 2nd Runner-Up win marks the first time since 2001 in which Montreal has placed in the Top Three.

Results

Special awards

Judges
Ellen Wong - Chairman of Board of Trustees of Wai Yin Association
Hacken Lee - singer, actor, television presenter
Kathy Chow - model and television presenter
William Leung - CEO, Sun Hung Kai Financial 
Peter H Pang - Council Member, Kowloon City District Council

Contestant list

References

External links
 Miss Chinese International Pageant 2014 Official Site

TVB
2014 beauty pageants
Beauty pageants in Hong Kong
Miss Chinese International Pageants
2014 in Hong Kong